Rae Selling Berry (January 21, 1881 – October 9, 1976) was an American gardener and horticulturist.

Early life
Berry, the daughter of Ben Selling and Mathilda Hess, grew up in Portland, Oregon.  In 1899, she went on a world tour.  She married Alfred Berry, a contractor who became the superintendent of the Portland International Airport.

Career
For more than thirty years, the couple and their three children lived in northeast Portland's Irvington neighborhood, where  Berry developed an interest in plants. Reading about plant expeditions to Europe and Asia, she began to provide financial support for the expeditions and through them to obtain seeds.  By the mid-1930s, Berry had run out of room for her plants in Irvington, and the couple moved to "a bowl-shaped site nestled near the top of a hill". The property, Berry Botanic Garden, just north of Lake Oswego, included a variety of habitats and terrain, and was partly covered with second-growth Douglas fir.

In developing the garden, Berry focused on "exceptional plants", particularly rhododendrons, primulas, and alpines. In 1964, the Garden Club of America awarded her the Florens de Bevoise Medal for her knowledge of plants.  In 1965, she won the American Rhododendron Society's first Award of Excellence given to a woman, and she was honored for her work by the American Rock Garden Society.

Berry continued to expand her collection past the age of 80, taking field trips in search of Oregon's only primrose, Primula cusickiana (Cusick's primrose). At age 90, she was still planting seeds in the gardens, and died at home at age 96.

See also

 List of people from Portland, Oregon

References

1881 births
1976 deaths
19th-century American women
American founders
American gardeners
American horticulturists
Death in Oregon
Irvington, Portland, Oregon
Women founders
Women horticulturists and gardeners
20th-century American women scientists
Scientists from Portland, Oregon